TransPennine Express (TPE), legally First TransPennine Express Limited, is a British train operating company owned by FirstGroup that operates the TransPennine Express franchise. It runs regional and inter-city rail services between the major cities and towns of Northern England and Scotland.

The franchise operates almost all its services to and through Manchester covering three main routes. The service provides rail links for major towns and cities such as Edinburgh, Glasgow, Liverpool, Sheffield, Hull, Leeds, York, Scarborough, Cleethorpes, Middlesbrough and Newcastle upon Tyne. TPE run trains 24 hours a day, including through New Year's Eve night. The franchise operates across the West Coast Main Line, Huddersfield Line, East Coast Main Line and part of the Tees Valley line.

The majority of TPE's rolling stock was procured during the late 2010s under Project Nova. These consist of the Nova 1 BMU trainsets, the Nova 2  CAF Civity EMUs, and the Nova 3 Mark 5A fixed-formation carriages paired with Class 68 diesel locomotives. These have replaced older rolling stock, such as the Bombardier Turbostar 170/3s and Siemens Desiro 350/4s, as well as some of their Siemens Desiro 185s, although these are still used on some routes. TPE has facilitated an operational shift towards more inter-city style services, although the commuter market remains important.

History

The TransPennine Express brand was launched in the early 1990s by British Rail's Regional Railways sector. It became part of Regional Railways North East and, on 2 March 1997, was privatised along with the majority of British Rail. Its first private sector operator, Northern Spirit, as well as its successor, Arriva Trains Northern, opted to maintain the brand.

In 2000, the Strategic Rail Authority announced that it planned to reorganise the North West Regional Railways and Regional Railways North East franchises operated by First North Western and Arriva Trains Northern. A TransPennine Express franchise would be created for the long-distance regional services, the remaining services being operated by a new Northern franchise.

In July 2003, the TransPennine franchise was awarded to a joint venture between FirstGroup and Keolis, and the services operated by Arriva Trains Northern and First North Western were transferred to First TransPennine Express on 1 February 2004.

In August 2014, the Department for Transport (DfT) announced FirstGroup, Keolis/Go-Ahead and Stagecoach had been shortlisted to bid for the next franchise. During December 2015, FirstGroup was awarded the franchise of TransPennine Express. The effective date of the new franchise was 1 April 2016 and will run until 31 March 2023, with an option to extend for two years. The company remains First TransPennine Express, but has branded the services as TransPennine Express.

In May 2021, following various COVID-19 emergency measures, the company was given a direct award contract by the DfT running until 28 May 2023.

TransPennine Express is one of several train operators impacted by the 2022–2023 United Kingdom railway strikes, which are the first national rail strikes in the UK for three decades. Its workers are amongst those who are participating in industrial action due to a dispute over pay and working conditions.

Services 
The TransPennine Express routes are subdivided into three operations:
 Anglo-Scottish Route, which consists of services on the West Coast Main Line;
 South Route, which includes services running on the Hope Valley line and the South Humberside Main Line.

As of December 2022, the following services operate off-peak, seven days a week:

Rolling stock
When TransPennine Express began operation, it inherited a fleet of four Class 170 and 51 Class 185 DMUs as well as ten Class 350/4 EMUs from First TransPennine Express. The Class 170s were transferred to Chiltern Railways, where they were converted to Class 168s. Originally it was planned after all the new trains in the Nova fleet entered service, 22 of the 51 Class 185 DMUs would be returned to Eversholt Rail Group. However these have remained with the franchise and to allow services to be strengthened and will continue to do so for the foreseeable future. Further cascades of rolling stock occurred over time; shortly following the introduction of the Class 397 sets during 2020, all ten of the Class 350 EMUs were transferred to West Midlands Trains.

Project Nova 
Upon its instatement, TransPennine Express (TPE) services were particularly heavily trafficked; prior to 2018, the operator reportedly operated the busiest trains in the country, and it was common for some passengers to be unable to be seated during rush hour. Reportedly, the franchise also aimed to reorientation its operations towards inter-city services over its inter-urban routes, although it shall continue to transport large numbers of commuters regardless. As a means of addressing these factors, TPE launched Project Nova, under which the vast majority of their existing rolling stock would be replaced by new-build trainsets with greater capacity. During 2016, TPE signed contracts valued at £500 million with Spanish rolling stock manufacturer Construcciones y Auxiliar de Ferrocarriles (CAF) to produce the majority of its Nova rolling stock. The Nova fleet is divided into three distinct categories; the Nova 1 being BMU sets derived from the Hitachi A-train family, the Nova 2 trainsets being CAF-built  Civity EMUs, and the Nova 3 sets consisting of locomotive-hauled CAF-built Mark 5A coaches.

The Nova 1 fleet had originally been ordered by TPE's predecessor as part of plans to bolster route capacity by 80%; having contracted with Hitachi Rail Europe for the latter to supply 19 five-car bi-mode trainsets. According to Robin Davis, TPE's head of new trains, a major rationale behind the Nova 1 fleet was its bi-mode capability, noting that electrification ambitions often had much uncertainty, while a bi-mode fleet eliminated the operational risk to such uncertainty. Davis also noted that, in the event of largescale electrification being funded and implemented, the Class 802s could have some of their engines removed to reduce roughly 15% of their weight and thus raise their efficiency. Furthermore, Leo Goodwin, TPE's managing director, has observed that while the Class 802s will have an initial maximum speed of 125 mph, they have the capability of being modified for operating at 140 mph if infrastructure upgrades were to permit such speeds at a future date.

The Nova 2 trainsets were CAF-built Class 397 EMUs, the design being a member of the preexisting Civity range. Davis observed the Class 397 procurement to be a natural fit in light of TPE's desire to rapidly increase capacity and CAF's reputation for speedily producing limited batches of trains. While the Class 397 is capable of attaining a maximum speed of 125 mph, it shall be limited to a service speed of 100 mph.

The Nova 3 trainsets use Mark 5A carriages, locomotive-hauled and designed for its inter-city routes. The choice to procure carriages was unusual for the UK market; it is reportedly the first procurement of such rolling stock since the Mark 4 sets for the InterCity 225 during the late 1980s. Davis claims that the expense of constructing DMUs suitable for inter-city services was prohibitive in comparison, and notes that it is to be operated as a fixed-formation push-pull train, not relying on run-arounds as historically performed by locomotive-hauled sets. From the onset, it was planned for these to be hauled by a small fleet of Class 68 locomotives, requiring minor control-oriented modifications by Stadler to do so. According to franchise documents filed with the Department for Transport (DfT), considerations have been made to alternatively hauling the Nova 3 carriages with Class 88 bi-mode locomotives, which are closely related to the Class 68; however, this would be dependent on relatively ambitious, and thus far unfunded, suggestions for widespread electrification in the region being fulfilled.

On 24 August 2019, the first new trains of the Nova fleet entered revenue service; these were the Nova 3 sets, comprising a Class 68 locomotive and a rake of Mark 5A coaches. On 28 September 2019, the Nova 1 (Class 802) sets followed, while operations of the Nova 2 trainsets (Class 397) commenced on 30 November 2019. TPE officially launched the Nova fleet on 22 November at Liverpool Lime Street station.

Current fleet

Past fleet
Former units operated by TransPennine Express include:

Future fleet

In 2022, FirstGroup released a provision seeking expressions of interest for suppliers to build a new fleet of at least 15 bi-mode locomotives. These will replace the TPE Class 68s and the GWR s.

Managed stations

TransPennine Express services run over large areas of northern England and southern Scottish Lowlands. Many of the largest stations they serve are managed by other train operating companies or Network Rail.

TransPennine Express manages the following 19 stations:

 
 
 
 
 
 
 Hull Paragon
 
 
 
 
 
 
 
 
 
 
 
 

Some stations from the former franchise operator First TransPennine Express were transferred to Northern.

Depots and servicing
Siemens maintains the Class 185 fleet at Ardwick depot in Manchester with a smaller facility in York. Scottish stabling points for both stock include Polmadie TRSMD (Glasgow) and Craigentinny T.&R.S.M.D. (Edinburgh). Hitachi maintains the Class 802 fleet at Doncaster Carr and Craigentinny. The new EMUs and loco-hauled sets will be maintained by Alstom, on behalf of TransPennine Express, at Longsight (Manchester), Edge Hill (Liverpool) and Polmadie (Glasgow). During 2020, in response to the COVID-19 pandemic, TPE invested £1.7 million into highly stringent rolling stock cleaning practices; these reportedly represented a 70% upsurge on pre-COVID-19 hygiene practices.

TransPennine Express have depots for its train crews at Manchester Piccadilly, Manchester Airport (conductors), York, Newcastle, Scarborough, Hull, Cleethorpes, Sheffield, Preston, Liverpool Lime Street and Glasgow Central.

Criticism
The TransPennine Express service is often criticised. A satirical article in 2022 called it the "ironically named TransPennine Express. You'd hate to take the non-Express service. It might be quicker to walk."

References

External links
 
 

FirstGroup railway companies
Railway companies established in 2016
Train operating companies in the United Kingdom
2016 establishments in England
British companies established in 2016